Rose Emma Lamartine Yates ( Janau; 23 February 1875 – 5 November 1954) was an English social campaigner and suffragette. She was educated at the Sorbonne and Oxford.

Together with her lawyer husband she worked for female suffrage from 1908 and during the First World War, and was willing to suffer arrest and incarceration for her beliefs. She travelled widely, giving lectures. She and her husband were also leading members of the Cyclists' Touring Club. After the war she was elected to the London County Council, where she campaigned for equal pay for men and women, better public housing, and the provision of nursery education. She later led the building of an archive of the suffrage campaign.

Life and career
Yates was born in Dalyell Road, Lambeth, London, to a language teacher, Elphège Janau (b. 1847), and his wife, Marie Pauline (1841–1909), both French-born and naturalised British citizens. She was the youngest of their three children. She was educated at high schools in Clapham and  Truro, and later at Kassel and the Sorbonne, Paris, and then, from 1896, at Royal Holloway College where she studied modern languages and philology.  She passed the Oxford final honours examination in 1899.

In 1900, she married a widower, Thomas Lamartine Yates ( Swindlehurst; 1849–1929). He was a solicitor, with a successful practice in Chancery Lane.  
Eight years after the marriage their only child, Paul (1908–2009), was born; he became an agricultural economist.  Both Thomas and Rose Lamartine Yates were keen cyclists, and were leading members of the Cyclists' Touring Club. In 1907 she was the first woman elected to the governing council of the club. She did not at that point consider herself a suffragette, but soon concluded "on looking into the matter seriously I find I have never been anything else [and] I came to realise that I was and must remain one at whatever personal cost". She joined the recently-founded Wimbledon branch of the Women's Social and Political Union (WSPU) in 1908.
[[File:Punch-verse-rose-lamartine-yates.jpg|upright=1.5|thumb|Punch'''s verse prompted by Yates's arrest in 1909]]
On 24 February 1909, Rose Lamartine Yates  was a member of a deputation led by Emmeline Pethick-Lawrence from Caxton Hall to the House of Commons. She was arrested, along with 28 other demonstrators, charged with obstruction and sentenced to a month's imprisonment. Her son was eight months old at the time, and Punch'' printed a set of verses criticising her for abandoning him. Her political activism had the full support of her husband, who defended her at the trial.

In 1910, she became honorary secretary of the Wimbledon WSPU; under her leadership it became one of the most flourishing branches of the organisation. Among those who came to address the branch were Mary Gawthorpe, George Lansbury and an old college friend, Emily Davison. She travelled widely, giving lectures. She and her husband made their house in Merton a refuge where activists released from prison could recuperate. In 1911, Thomas Lamartine Yates was arrested during a demonstration against the government for blocking a bill to allow limited female suffrage. He was not charged, but the publicity damaged his law firm for a time. He made himself available as legal adviser to WSPU prisoners, and, in June 1913, he represented the Davison family at the inquest into Emily Davison's death after throwing herself under the king's horse at the Derby. Together with Mary Leigh, Rose was at the dying Davison's bedside, and headed a guard of honour for the funeral procession.

At the beginning of the First World War the Wimbledon WSPU converted its meeting room and shop into a soup kitchen and opened another in nearby Merton. The war precipitated a split between Lamartine Yates and the leading suffragette, Emmeline Pankhurst. Under the latter's leadership the WSPU suspended its militant campaign for female suffrage, instead backing the government in the fight against Germany. Lamartine Yates and others disagreed with this policy, and broke away to form a new body, the Suffragettes of the WSPU.

In the general election of 1918, in which for the first time, limited female suffrage was granted, Lamartine Yates was adopted as Labour candidate for the Wimbledon constituency, but both she and the Liberal candidate withdrew shortly before polling. The following year she was elected to the London County Council, its only independent member. Seven other women candidates stood successfully in the same election. She served for three years, championing equal pay, increased public housing, and the provision of nursery education.

Lamartine Yates led the way in building an archive of the suffrage campaign, and, in 1939, she opened the Women's Record House in Great Smith Square, London. The building was bombed during the Second World War, but some of its records were saved and were moved to the Suffragette Fellowship collection in the Museum of London.

Rose Lamartine Yates died at her London home at the age of 79.

Notes, references and sources

Notes

References

Sources
 

1875 births
1954 deaths
British women's rights activists
English feminists
English suffragists
Women councillors in England
Feminism and history
Women's suffrage in the United Kingdom
Members of London County Council